ilyAIMY  is an American folk music band.

ilyAIMY has developed a following primarily through folk music festivals such as Eddie's Attic Acoustic Shootout and coffeehouses in the Mid-Atlantic, northeastern, and Midwestern areas of the United States. ilyAIMY has toured in many parts of the United States, Canada, and Mexico. The band is symbolized by an iconic spine created by Hinkal.

Members
 rob Hinkal – acoustic guitar, vocals
 Heather Aubrey Lloyd – acoustic guitar, vocals, cajón, djembe
 Kristen Jones – cello, electric cello, vocals
 Rowan Corbett – djembe, bones, cajón, percussion, vocals
 Sharif Kellogg – bass guitar, keyboard
 Joey Jenkins – percussion

Former Members
 Audrey Engdahl - acoustic guitar, vocals
 Frank Rusch - bass guitar
 Alfred Kamajian - percussion

History
ilyAIMY was originally inspired by a four-member musical ensemble called "i love you And I MIss You" formed in the mid-1990s, with members rob Hinkal, William Schaff, Carin Wagner (now Sloan), and Sonny Roelle, all of whom were students at the Maryland Institute College of Art. The band released a two-cassette (90 minutes each) collection of songs, and it recorded another that was not released. 

Heather Lloyd joined the band in the summer of 2001, and Kristen Jones joined in 2009. Sharif Kellogg, Rowan Corbett, and Joey Jenkins joined the band as well.

The band, primarily in the form of Hinkal and Lloyd, has toured the country since September 1, 2003. 

The band is known for its high-energy blend of folk, jazz, acoustic rock, and blues.

Name etymology
The name ilyAIMY is an acronym for "I love you and I miss you" inspired by William Schaff's musical ensemble of the same name.  

 I Love You and I Miss You, 1996
 Jump starting the Bus, 1997
 The Grave, 1998
 Strength in Hare, 1998
 Clockwork Wooden Mouse Dreams, 1998
 Strength in Hare - A Mere Demonstration, 2000
 Wingsweep/Wingswept, 2000
 Bulldozer Not Included, 2001
 Myxomatosis Failed, 2003
 On Luck On Fumes On Spit On Love, 2003
 Myxomatosis Took Its Toll, 2005
 The Fifth Circle, 2006
 Between Lover and Twilight, 2007
 A Gift for Saint Cecilia, 2009
 Another Life/Another Live (Double CD) 2013
 Live at the New Deal Cafe, 2020

Heather Aubrey Lloyd
 Samples, 2010 (as Heather Lloyd)
 A Message in the Mess, 2017
 The Lucky Ones, 2018

Awards
2021 - Mid-Atlantic Song Contest GOLD for "Quarantiner"
2021 - Mid-Atlantic Song Contest GOLD for "unEven"
2019-2020  --Silver -Mid-Atlantic Song Contest, Adult Contemporary  --GRAND PRIZE WINNER - Bernard Ebb Songwriting Award
2017 - 2018 SERFA -Formal Showcase  --Nat'l Women's Music Fest -New Artist  --Falcon Ridge Folk Fest -Most Wanted  --Telluride Folk Fest -(4th) Troubadour  --Mid-Atlantic Song Contest -Director's Award, Album of the Year  --Rocky Mtn. Folks Fest -Hon. Mention
2016 American Songwriter Magazine Lyric Contest - Honorable Mention
2015 Washington Area Music Awards "Best Contemporary Folk / Acoustic Artist"
2014 Washington Area Music Awards "Best Contemporary Folk / Acoustic Artist"
2012 Northeast Regional Folk Alliance Formal Showcase Artist
2012 Falcon Ridge Folk Festival Most-Wanted Artist
2011 Northeast Regional Folk Alliance DJ Showcase Artist
2011 Falcon Ridge Folk Festival Emerging Artist
2010 Mid-Atlantic Formal Showcase Artist - National Association for Campus Activities
2009 Finalist Eddie's Attic Acoustic Open Mic Shootout
2007: "In the Water" selected as "One of the Best Songs of 2006" by www.indieacoustic.com
2006: Heather Lloyd – Honorable Mention in the International Narrative Song Contest ("In the Water")
2006: Heather Lloyd – Winner of the Cape Fear Folk Festival High Noon Shootout
2006: Heather Lloyd – Finalist at the Susquehanna Music and Arts Festival Singer/Songwriter Competition
2005: Finalists at Eddie's Attic Acoustic Open Mic Shootout XXII
2005: rob Hinkal – Finalist at the Grassy Hill Kerrville New Folk
2005: rob Hinkal – 3rd place at the Susquehanna Music and Arts Festival Singer/Songwriter Competition
2005: Heather Lloyd – Finalist at the Susquehanna Music and Arts Festival Singer/Songwriter Competition
2004: Winner at the Takoma Park Folk Festival Emerging Artist Showcase
2002: Nominated Best Contemporary Folk Group or Duo, Washington Area Music Association
2001: Nominated Best Alternative Rock Album for Wingsweep/Wingswept, Washington Area Music Association

External links
 
 

American folk musical groups